The Duke University School of Nursing is located in Durham, NC and is affiliated with Duke University and Duke University Health System. The school offers an accelerated Bachelor of Science in Nursing, a Master of Science in Nursing, Doctorate in Nursing Practice (DNP), and a Ph.D. Program. The 2022 U.S. News & World Report ranked the school as the third best graduate nursing school in the nation.

On January 2, 1931, the school opened its doors to its first class of 24 undergraduate students under the direction of Dean Bessie Baker and instructor Ann Henshaw Gardiner. The three-year nursing diploma program offered the first nurse anesthesia program in the state.

The school has offered many different degrees over the years. The first students, high school graduates, received a diploma after a three-year program that cost just $100 per year. In 1938, the school began offering baccalaureate degrees to students who had completed two years of college along with the nursing curricula. In 1944, the school began a Bachelor of Science in Nursing Education degree program. In 1953, it added a Bachelor of Science in Nursing (BSN) degree program. Five years later, under the leadership of Thelma Ingles, The Duke School of Nursing was one of the first schools in the nation to offer a graduate nursing program.

In 1984, as a part of Duke University's retrenchment plan, the last class of BSN students graduated. The graduate programs also ended in 1984, re-opening in 1985 with a new curriculum and focus on research. In response to the increasing nursing shortage, the school once again began offering a BSN degree in 2002– this time as an accelerated, 16-month degree offered to students already holding an undergraduate degree. In 2006, the school accepted the first students into the new PhD program. In 2008, the school launched the first Doctor of Nursing Practice (DNP) degree program in North Carolina to prepare nurses for leadership positions in clinical care.

In 2021, Duke's School of Nursing received $8.5 million in funding from the National Institutes of Health. October 2022, Dr. Vincent Guilamo-Ramos was named dean of the university.

References

External links
 

Nursing, School of
Educational institutions established in 1931
Nursing schools in North Carolina
Duke University campus
1931 establishments in North Carolina